Plietesials are  plants that grow for a number of years, flower gregariously (synchronously), set seed and then die.
The length of the cycle can vary between 8 and 16 years. For example, the neelakurinji plant flowers every 12 years and 
bloomed as expected in 2006 and 2018 in the Munnar region of Kerala, India.

Certain species of unrelated families of flowering plants (including Poaceae, Arecaceae, Scrophulariaceae, Fabaceae, Apocynaceae, and Acanthaceae) are plietesial. The term plietesial has been used in reference to perennial monocarpic plants "of the kind most often met with in the Strobilanthinae" (a subtribe of Acanthaceae containing Strobilanthes and allied genera) that usually grow gregariously, flower simultaneously following a long interval, set seed, and die. Other commonly used expressions or terms describing a plietesial life history include gregarious flowering, mast seeding, and supra-annual synchronized semelparity (semelparity = monocarpy).  It is not clear why gregarious flowering after long vegetative intervals would be associated with death after flowering, although both are associated with higher reproductive outputs.

Description
A good description of this natural history aspect of a plant's life cycle can be found in the following report:

See also
 Masting
 Monocarpic
 Semelparity
 Strobilanthes callosus
 Strobilanthes kunthiana

References

 Daniel, Thomas F. 2006. Synchronous flowering and monocarpy suggest plietesial life history for neotropical Stenostephanus chiapensis (Acanthaceae). PROCEEDINGS OF THE CALIFORNIA ACADEMY OF SCIENCES. Fourth Series. Volume 57, No. 38, pp. 1011–1018, 1 fig. December 28, 2006

Plant life-forms
Plant reproduction
Fertility